Butte Creek Summit (el. ) is a mountain pass in Oregon traversed by Oregon Route 19.

References

Mountain passes of Oregon
Transportation in Wheeler County, Oregon